Martin Ward (born 11 March 1988) is a British professional boxer.

Boxing career

Amateur record
Ward won the 2010 Amateur Boxing Association British featherweight title, when boxing out of the Repton ABC.

Professional record
He challenged for the IBF bantamweight title in 2014. At regional level, he held the Commonwealth bantamweight title in 2013, challenged for the British bantamweight title in 2013 and the super bantamweight title in 2015.

References

External links

Image - Martin Ward

1988 births
Bantamweight boxers
English male boxers
Featherweight boxers
Living people
People from Houghton-le-Spring
Sportspeople from Tyne and Wear
Sportspeople from County Durham
Super-bantamweight boxers
Super-featherweight boxers